The Men's individual recurve was one of the events held in archery at the 2008 Summer Paralympics in Beijing. There were two classes: a class for W1 & W2 wheelchair competitors and a class for standing archers. In the ranking round each archer shot 72 arrows; in the knockout stages each match was 12 arrows each.

W1/W2

The W1/W2 class was won by Cheng Changjie, representing .

Ranking Round

Competition bracket

Standing

The Standing class was won by Dambadondogiin Baatarjav, representing .

Ranking Round

Competition bracket

References

M